Mavrovo Lake is situated in the Mavrovo region, in the Mavrovo and Rostuša municipality of the Republic of North Macedonia, less than 100 km from Skopje. It is an important tourist destination, being frequented for recreational activities such as swimming, boating and trout fishing during the summer; a distinctive building in the lake is the half-submerged church of Saint Nicholas. Since 1952 it is part of the Mavrovo National Park.

The lake is surrounded by the Šar Mountains on the North and the Bistra Mountains on the South,  both exceeding heights of 2000 m.

Gallery

References 

Lakes of North Macedonia
Mavrovo and Rostuša Municipality